Marcel Marti may refer to:* Marcel Martí (born 1925), Argentine-born sculptor
 Marcel Marti (ski mountaineer) (born 1983), Swiss ski mountaineer